Lapanga is a census town in the Patratu CD block in the  Ramgarh subdivision of the Ramgarh district in the Indian state of Jharkhand.

Geography

Location                      

Area overview
Ramgarh has a vibrant coal-mining sector. The map alongside provides links to five operational areas of Central Coalfields spread across South Karanpura Coalfield, Ramgarh Coalfield and West Bokaro Coalfield. Four of the six CD blocks in the district have coal mines – Patratu, Ramgarh, Mandu and Chitarpur. The high concentration of census towns in these blocks are noticeable on the map. Only two blocks, Gola and Dulmi, are totally rural areas. Ramgarh district lies in the central part of the Chota Nagpur Plateau. The Damodar valley covers most of the district. The forested areas in highlands to the north and the south of the valley can be seen in the map (mark the shaded areas). "Chotanagpur has a charm of its own… The entire area forms one of the most charming series of views imaginable. The far-off hills in the background in exquisite tints of blue or purple as the light falls, the nearer hills picturesquely shaped and luxuriant in every shade of green with their bold escarpments in black or grey, and the brown plains below furnishing their quota of colours." 

Note: The map alongside presents some of the notable locations in the district. All places marked in the map are linked in the larger full screen map.

Demographics
According to the 2011 Census of India, Lapanga had a total population of 8,017, of which 4,193 (52%) were males and 3,824 (48%) were females. Population in the age range 0-6 years was 963. The total number of literate persons in Lapanga was 5,668 (80.35% of the population over 6 years).

Infrastructure
According to the District Census Handbook 2011, Ramgarh, Lapanga covered an area of 1.398 km2. Among the civic amenities, it had 10 km roads with open drains, the protected water supply involved uncovered well, hand pump. It had 1,250 domestic electric connections. Among the medical facilities, it had 4 hospitals, 6 dispensaries, 6 health centres, 9 family welfare centres, 7 maternity and child welfare centres, 9 maternity homes, 4 nursing homes, 1 medicine shop. Among the educational facilities it had 1 primary school, 1 middle school, other school facilities at Barkakana 9 km away. It had 1 non-formal educational centre (Sarva Siksha Abhiyan). Among the social, recreational and cultural facilities it had 1 stadium. One important commodity it produced was coal. It had the branch office of 1 nationalised bank.

Transport
There is a station at Bhurkunda on the Barkakana-Son Nagar line.

Lapanga is off State Highway 2.

References

Cities and towns in Ramgarh district